Alexander John Travers Allan MB ChB known generally as Jack Allan (17 November 1875 – 3 March 1898) was a Scottish amateur golfer who won the British Amateur Championship in 1897 at Muirfield.

Biography 
Allan was born on the Isle of Portland in Dorset, the son of Margaret Bird Munro and Surgeon Colonel Alexander Allan (1836–1892), a Scottish surgeon working there in the Royal Navy Hospital.

He studied medicine at the University of Edinburgh and had graduated MBChB. While studying for his full qualification as a doctor (MD), and was probably undergoing practical training at the Edinburgh Royal Infirmary, when he contracted tuberculosis.

He died in Edinburgh of tuberculosis at the age of 22. He is buried in the southern section of Morningside Cemetery. His parents are buried opposite.

Major championships

Amateur wins (1)

This was Allan's only appearance in the Amateur Championship.

References

Scottish male golfers
Amateur golfers
Alumni of the University of Edinburgh
Tuberculosis deaths in Scotland
19th-century deaths from tuberculosis
1875 births
1898 deaths